Marshbrook railway station was a station in Marshbrook, Shropshire, England. The station was opened in 1852 and closed in 1958.

References

Further reading

Disused railway stations in Shropshire
Railway stations in Great Britain opened in 1852
Railway stations in Great Britain closed in 1958
Former Shrewsbury and Hereford Railway stations